HMPNGS Ted Diro (P401) is the first  to be completed. Australia designed and provided four s to Papua New Guinea in 1987 and 1988, and in 2015 confirmed she would be replacing those vessels with four larger, and more capable, Guardian-class vessels.

Ted Diro replaced .  Australia transferred the vessel to Papua New Guinea on November 30, 2018.

Background

Following the United Nations Convention on the Law of the Sea extension of maritime nations' exclusive economic zones to  Australia agreed to provide twelve of its neighbours with twenty-two Pacific Forum-class patrol vessels, so they could exercise sovereignty over their own territory, using their own resources.  The first vessel was delivered in 1987, and in 2015 Australia announced plans to replace the original patrol boats with larger and more capable vessels.

Design

Australian ship builder Austal won the $335 million Australian dollar contract for the project, and built the vessels at its Henderson shipyard, near Perth.  Guardian class vessels were designed to use commercial off-the-shelf components, not cutting edge, military grade equipment, to make them easier to maintain in small isolated shipyards.

Their design allows the recipient nations to mount a pair of heavy machine guns, on either flank, and possibly an autocannon of up to 30mm, on the foredeck.

Operational history

Ted Diro was the first Guardian-class vessel to have her keel laid in July 2017. She was the first to be launched, in May 2018. She began her formal sea trials on August 9, 2018. The patrol vessel is scheduled to be commissioned in late October, when her acceptance trials are completed.

On October 22, 2018, the Post Courier reported that delivery was scheduled for December. Diro, head of the PNGDF Major General Gilbert Toropo and Angus Campbell, Chief of the Australian Defence Force, attended the vessel's commissioning, on February 1, 2019.

In August 2019 two warships of the Japan Maritime Self-Defense Force visited Port Moresby.  The Japanese vessels hosted the crew of Ted Diro, together with local VIPs, and her crew hosted visiting Japanese personnel on tours of Ted Diro.

On October 17, 2019, The Australian reported that Ted Diros engines had broken down, and she had to be towed back to Cairns, for repairs.

References

External links

2018 ships
Patrol vessels of the Papua New Guinea Defence Force
Ted Diro
Ships built by Austal